East Fairfield is an unincorporated village in the town of Fairfield, Franklin County, Vermont, United States. East Fairfield has a post office with ZIP code 05448.

References

Unincorporated communities in Franklin County, Vermont
Unincorporated communities in Vermont